Bothria is a genus of flies in the family Tachinidae.

Species
B. clarinigra Chao & Liu, 1998
B. frontosa (Meigen, 1824)
B. subalpina Villeneuve, 1910

References

Tachinidae genera
Exoristinae
Taxa named by Camillo Rondani